The Price of Folly is a 1937 British drama film directed by Walter Summers and starring Leonora Corbett, Colin Keith-Johnston and Judy Kelly. The screenplay concerns a man who, after a failed attempt to kill a woman, finds himself blackmailed over the incident.

The film was based on the play Double Error by J. Lee Thompson. The film was produced and distributed by the large ABPC combine for whom Thompson later became an established director. It was shot at Welwyn Studios with sets designed by the art director Cedric Dawe.

Main cast
 Leonora Corbett as Christine
 Colin Keith-Johnston as Martin
 Judy Kelly as Frances
 Andreas Malandrinos as Gomez
 Leslie Perrins as Owen
 Wally Patch as Man with Tip
 The Trocadero Girls as Dancers

References

Bibliography
 Low, Rachael. Filmmaking in 1930s Britain. George Allen & Unwin, 1985.
 Wood, Linda. British Films, 1927-1939. British Film Institute, 1986.

External links

1937 films
1937 drama films
British drama films
1930s English-language films
Films directed by Walter Summers
British black-and-white films
Films set in London
Films shot at Welwyn Studios
Films with screenplays by J. Lee Thompson
British films based on plays
1930s British films